Balme is a comune (municipality) in the Metropolitan City of Turin in the Italian region Piedmont.

Balme borders the following municipalities: Ala di Stura, Bessans (France), Bonneval-sur-Arc (France), Groscavallo, Lemie, and Usseglio.

References

Cities and towns in Piedmont